Niels Andreas Thrap (2 October 1793 – 9 November 1856) was Norwegian civil servant and politician. He was temporary Minister of Finance in 1852 and 1854, and temporary Minister of the Navy 1852–53.

He obtained a cand.jur. degree in 1815 and worked as magistrate (byfogd) in Christiania from 1831. He was a member of the Parliament of Norway from Christiania in one period from 1833 to 1835.

References 

1793 births
1856 deaths
Government ministers of Norway
Ministers of Finance of Norway
Members of the Storting
19th-century Norwegian politicians